Polish studies, or Polonistics (or polonistyka) is the field of humanities that researches, documents and disseminates the Polish language and Polish literature in both historic and present-day forms. 

In the United States, students taking Polish studies majors focus on the nation, current and historical inhabitants of Polish lands, both current and historical, and instruction includes a wide range of and humanities, such as culture, politics, and economics.

Academic activities in Polish Studies include conferences, workshops, and book publications by scholars who work and teach on Polish history, culture, art, and politics. The Polish Studies Association is part of the American Association for the Advancement of Slavic Studies and facilitates "the exchange of academic information regarding Polish history, culture, arts, politics, economics, and contemporary affairs, and seeks to enhance contacts between Polish and Western Affairs."

The Departments of Polish Studies exist in all major universities across Poland, and in many academic institutions across the world. They offer students a range of academic programmes with Bachelor and Masters' degrees in the field.

University programs 
Some of the Polish Studies programs at U.S. universities include:
 Polish Studies at Georgetown University
 Polish Studies Center at the Indiana University at Bloomington
  Polish Studies Program at the University at Buffalo, The State University of New York
 Polish Studies at Columbia University
  Copernicus Program in Polish Studies at the University of Michigan
 Polish and Polish American Studies at Central Connecticut State University
 Polish Studies at the University of Florida
 The Polish Studies Program at the University of Wisconsin–Madison, the oldest Polish program in the United States
 Polish Studies Program at the University of Washington in Seattle

References 
Inline

General
 The Centre for Polish Studies (Centrum Kształcenia Języka Polskiego). Warszawa, Poland; 2009
 Kurczaba, Alex S. "Polish Studies in American Higher Education", The Sarmatian Review, January 2001

 
Polish language